János Pach (born May 3, 1954) is a mathematician and computer scientist working in the fields of combinatorics and discrete and computational geometry.

Biography
Pach was born and grew up in Hungary. He comes from a noted academic family: his father,  (1919–2001) was a well-known historian, and his mother Klára (née Sós, 1925–2020) was a university mathematics teacher; his maternal aunt Vera T. Sós and her husband Pál Turán are two of the best-known Hungarian mathematicians.

Pach received his Candidate degree from the Hungarian Academy of Sciences, in 1983, where his advisor was Miklós Simonovits.

Since 1977, he has been affiliated with the Alfréd Rényi Institute of Mathematics of the Hungarian Academy of Sciences.

He was Research Professor at the Courant Institute of Mathematical Sciences at NYU  (since 1986), Distinguished Professor of Computer Science at City College, CUNY (1992-2011), and Neilson Professor at Smith College (2008-2009).

Between 2008 and 2019, he was Professor of the Chair of Combinatorial Geometry at École Polytechnique Fédérale de Lausanne.

He was the program chair for the International Symposium on Graph Drawing in 2004 and
Symposium on Computational Geometry in 2015. He is co-editor-in-chief of the journal Discrete and Computational Geometry, and he serves on the editorial boards of several other journals including Combinatorica, SIAM Journal on Discrete Mathematics, Computational Geometry, Graphs and Combinatorics, Central European Journal of Mathematics, and Moscow Journal of Combinatorics and Number Theory.

He was an invited speaker at the Combinatorics session of the International Congress of Mathematicians, in Seoul, 2014.
He was a plenary speaker at the European Congress of Mathematics (Portorož), 2021.

Research
Pach has authored several books and over 300 research papers. He was one of the most frequent collaborators of Paul Erdős, authoring over 20 papers with him and thus has an Erdős number of one.

Pach's research is focused in the areas of combinatorics and discrete geometry.
In 1981, he solved Ulam's problem,  showing that there exists
no universal planar graph.
In the early 90s
together with Micha Perles, he initiated the systematic study of extremal problems on topological and
geometric graphs.

Some of Pach's most-cited research work concerns the combinatorial complexity of families of curves in the plane and their applications to motion planning problems the maximum number of k-sets and halving lines that a planar point set may have, crossing numbers of graphs, embedding of planar graphs onto fixed sets of points, and lower bounds for epsilon-nets.

Awards and honors
Pach received the Grünwald Medal of the János Bolyai Mathematical Society (1982), the Ford Award from the Mathematical Association of America (1990), and the Alfréd Rényi Prize from the Hungarian Academy of Sciences (1992). He was an Erdős Lecturer at Hebrew University of Jerusalem in 2005. 
In 2011 he was listed as a fellow of the Association for Computing Machinery for his research in computational geometry.
In 2014 he was elected as a member of Academia Europaea, and in 2015 as a fellow of the American Mathematical Society "for contributions to discrete and combinatorial geometry and to convexity and combinatorics."
In 2022 he was elected corresponding member of the Hungarian Academy of Sciences.

Books
.
.
.
.
.
.
.
.
.
.

See also
 Mountain climbing problem

References

External links
 Personal website of János Pach
 Chair of Combinatorial Geometry, EPFL
 János Pach in the EPFL people directory
 

1954 births
Living people
American computer scientists
Hungarian computer scientists
20th-century American mathematicians
Graph theorists
Graph drawing people
20th-century Hungarian mathematicians
21st-century Hungarian mathematicians
City University of New York faculty
Courant Institute of Mathematical Sciences faculty
Hungarian Academy of Sciences
Researchers in geometric algorithms
Fellows of the Association for Computing Machinery
Academic staff of the École Polytechnique Fédérale de Lausanne
Fellows of the American Mathematical Society
21st-century American mathematicians